In Greek mythology and ancient Greek religion, Mnemosyne is the goddess of memory and the mother of the nine Muses by her nephew Zeus. In the Greek tradition, Mnemosyne is one of the Titans, the twelve divine children of the earth-goddess Gaia and the sky-god Uranus. The term Mnemosyne is derived from the same source as the word mnemonic, that being the Greek word mnēmē, which means "remembrance, memory".

Family 
A Titaness, Mnemosyne is the daughter of Uranus and Gaia. Mnemosyne became the mother of the nine Muses, fathered by her nephew, Zeus:

 Calliope (epic poetry)
 Clio (history)
 Euterpe (music and lyric poetry)
 Erato (love poetry)
 Melpomene (tragedy)
 Polyhymnia (hymns)
 Terpsichore (dance)
 Thalia (comedy)
 Urania (astronomy)

Hyginus in his Fabulae gives Mnemosyne a different parentage, where she was the daughter of Zeus and Clymene.

Mythology 

In Hesiod's Theogony, kings and poets receive their powers of authoritative speech from their possession of Mnemosyne and their special relationship with the Muses.
Zeus, in a form of a mortal shepherd, and Mnemosyne slept together for nine consecutive nights, thus conceiving the nine Muses. Mnemosyne also presided over a pool in Hades, counterpart to the river Lethe, according to a series of 4th-century BC Greek funerary inscriptions in dactylic hexameter. Dead souls drank from Lethe so they would not remember their past lives when reincarnated. In Orphism, the initiated were taught to instead drink from the Mnemosyne, the river of memory, which would stop the transmigration of the soul.

Appearance in oral literature 
Although she was categorized as one of the Titans in the Theogony, Mnemosyne did not quite fit that distinction. Titans were hardly worshiped in Ancient Greece, and were thought of as so archaic as to belong to the ancient past. They resembled historical figures more than anything else. Mnemosyne, on the other hand, traditionally appeared in the first few lines of many oral epic poems—she appears in both the Iliad and the Odyssey, among others—as the speaker called upon her aid in accurately remembering and performing the poem they were about to recite. Mnemosyne is thought to have been given the distinction of "Titan" because memory was so important and basic to the oral culture of the Greeks that they deemed her one of the essential building blocks of civilization in their creation myth.

Later, once written literature overtook the oral recitation of epics, Plato made reference in his Euthydemus to the older tradition of invoking Mnemosyne. The character Socrates prepares to recount a story and says "ὥστ᾽ ἔγωγε, καθάπερ οἱ (275d) ποιηταί, δέομαι ἀρχόμενος τῆς διηγήσεως Μούσας τε καὶ Μνημοσύνην ἐπικαλεῖσθαι." which translates to "Consequently, like the poets, I must needs begin my narrative with an invocation of the Muses and Memory" (emphasis added). Aristophanes also harked back to the tradition in his play Lysistrata when a drunken Spartan ambassador invokes her name while prancing around pretending to be a bard from times of yore.

Cult 

While not one of the most popular divinities, Mnemosyne was the subject of some minor worship in Ancient Greece. Statues of her are mentioned in the sanctuaries of other gods, and she was often depicted alongside her daughters the Muses. She was also worshipped in Lebadeia in Boeotia, at Mount Helicon in Boeotia, and in the cult of Asclepius.

There was a statue of Mnemosyne in the shrine of Dionysos at Athens, alongside the statues of the Muses, Zeus and Apollo, as well as a statue with her daughters the Muses in the Temple of Athena Alea. Pausanias described the worship of Mnemosyne in Lebadeia in Boeotia, where she played an important part in the oracular sanctuary of Trophonios: 

Mnemosyne was also sometime regarded as being not the mother of the Muses but as one of them, and as such she was worshiped in the sanctuary of the Muses at Mount Helicon in Boeotia:

Cult of Asclepius 
Mnemosyne was one of the deities worshiped in the cult of Asclepius that formed in Ancient Greece around the 5th century BC. Asclepius, a Greek hero and god of medicine, was said to have been able to cure maladies, and the cult incorporated a multitude of other Greek heroes and gods in its process of healing. The exact order of the offerings and prayers varied by location, and the supplicant often made an offering to Mnemosyne. After making an offering to Asclepius himself, in some locations, one last prayer was said to Mnemosyne as the supplicant moved to the holiest portion of the Asclepeion to incubate. The hope was that a prayer to Mnemosyne would help the supplicant remember any visions had while sleeping there.

Genealogy

See also 
 Titans in popular culture: Mnemosyne
 Meme
 Moneta
 Lethe

References

Sources

Hesiod, The Homeric Hymns and Homerica with an English Translation by Hugh G. Evelyn-White, Cambridge, MA.,Harvard University Press; London, William Heinemann Ltd. 1914. Online version at the Perseus Digital Library.
Anonymous, The Homeric Hymns and Homerica with an English Translation by Hugh G. Evelyn-White. Homeric Hymns. Cambridge, MA.,Harvard University Press; London, William Heinemann Ltd. 1914. Online version at the Perseus Digital Library.
Aeschylus, Persians. Seven against Thebes. Suppliants. Prometheus Bound. Edited and translated by Alan H. Sommerstein. Loeb Classical Library No. 145. Cambridge, Massachusetts: Harvard University Press, 2009. . Online version at Harvard University Press.
Diodorus Siculus, Diodorus Siculus: The Library of History. Translated by Charles Henry Oldfather. Twelve volumes. Loeb Classical Library. Cambridge, Massachusetts: Harvard University Press; London: William Heinemann, Ltd. 1989.Online version at the Lacus Curtius: Into the Roman World.
Ovid, Metamorphoses translated by Brookes More (1859-1942). Boston, Cornhill Publishing Co. 1922. Online version at the Topos Text Project.
 Apollodorus, Apollodorus, The Library, with an English Translation by Sir James George Frazer, F.B.A., F.R.S. in 2 Volumes. Cambridge, Massachusetts, Harvard University Press; London, William Heinemann Ltd. 1921. Online version at the Perseus Digital Library.
Hyginus, Fabulae from The Myths of Hyginus translated and edited by Mary Grant. University of Kansas Publications in Humanistic Studies. Online version at the Topos Text Project.
Pausanias, Description of Greece with an English Translation by W.H.S. Jones, Litt.D., and H.A. Ormerod, M.A., in 4 Volumes. Cambridge, MA, Harvard University Press; London, William Heinemann Ltd. 1918. Online version at the Perseus Digital Library
Antoninus Liberalis, The Metamorphoses of Antoninus Liberalis translated by Francis Celoria (Routledge 1992). Online version at the Topos Text Project.
Clement of Alexandria, Recognitions from Ante-Nicene Library Volume 8, translated by Smith, Rev. Thomas. T. & T. Clark, Edinburgh. 1867. Online version at theio.com
 Caldwell, Richard, Hesiod's Theogony, Focus Publishing/R. Pullins Company (June 1, 1987). .

Further reading

External links 

 
 MNEMOSYNE from The Theoi Project
 MNEMOSYNE from Greek Mythology Link

Divine women of Zeus
Greek goddesses
Memory in culture
Children of Gaia
Personifications in Greek mythology
Titans (mythology)
Metamorphoses characters